Girchan may refer to:

Girchan, Khorramabad
Girchan, Zagheh